The Pandoran biosphere is a fictional habitat introduced in James Cameron's 2009 science fiction film  Avatar. The ecology of the lush exomoon Pandora, which teems with a biodiversity of bioluminescent species ranging from hexapodal animals to other types of exotic fauna and flora, forms a vast neural network spanning the entire lunar surface into which the Na'vi and other creatures can connect. The strength of this collective consciousness is illustrated when the human invaders are defeated in battle by the Pandoran ecology, after the Na'vi are nearly defeated. Cameron utilized a team of expert advisors to make the various examples of fauna and flora as scientifically feasible as possible.

Na'vi

Appearance
In Avatar, the Na'vi are an indigenous species that live on Pandora. The Na'vi differ from humans in having blue striped skin, pointed and mobile ears, large eyes, catlike noses and tails, and hands each with three fingers and a thumb (hybrid avatars, on the other hand, retain the five-fingered hands of their human DNA). While taller than humans, they have narrower proportions in body frame. Their bones are reinforced with naturally occurring carbon fiber. The Na'vi also have a distinctive tendril feature protruding from the back of their heads, surrounded by hair (resembling a long plait or queue), feeding directly into the brain. This organ allows them to connect with other organisms, transferring electrochemical signals such as thoughts and memories. In the original script, Cameron refers to these as "Jubilees", although the word is not used in the film and may be changed by the time the novel is published. The Na'vi were initially conceived to be more alien in appearance. Cameron recalled when one of the main characters, Neytiri, was originally drawn, she had gills and other protuberances. In addition to feline features, the species were redesigned to seem more human so audiences could better relate to them.

The sequel, Avatar: The Way of Water, introduces Na'vi from the Metkayina tribe with a number of qualities that distinguish them from the blue-skinned Omatikaya clan in Avatar. The Metkayina have evolved characteristics conducive to an aquatic lifestyle of swimming and diving. These adaptations include green/teal skin, stronger arms, thicker tails, inner eyelids.

According to Cameron, the appearance of the Na'vi character Neytiri had some specific inspirations and requirements: she was inspired by Raquel Welch's character in Fantastic Voyage and by Vampirella, noting in the latter's case, "the fact [Vampirella] didn't exist didn't bother me because we have these quintessential female images in our mind, and in the case of the male mind, they're grossly distorted. When you see something that reflects your id, it works for you.... Right from the beginning I said, 'She's got to have tits,' even though that makes no sense because her race, the Na'vi, aren't placental mammals. I designed her costumes based on a taparrabo, a loincloth worn by Mayan Indians." This is somewhat of a non-sequitur because both marsupials (kangaroos, etc.) and monotremes (platypuses, etc.) are non-placental and yet both lactate. This objective of making the Na'vi as humanlike as possible can also be seen as an explanation as to why they are quadrupedal despite having evolved from common ancestors of the hexapodal lemurs seen in the film.

Cameron has described Avatar as more "science fantasy" than true science fiction and has said that he would explain in the novel for the film why in the fictional universe the Na'vi look like humans.

Culture and language

According to Entertainment Weekly, "The Na'vi can commune with animals on their planet by literally plugging their braid into the creatures' nerve systems. To become a warrior, a Na'vi must tame and ride a flying creature known as Ikran." The Na'vi also use this neural bonding system, called "tsaheylu", to mate with a "life partner", a bond that, when made, cannot be broken in the Na'vi's lifetime. This is akin to human marriage.

The Na'vi way of life revolves around their religion, and the Home Tree. The Na'vi sleep in hammocks in large groups for comfort and as a warning system. 

Conceived for the film was the Na'vi language, a constructed language often spoken by the actors when they played Na'vi characters. The Na'vi language was created by communications professor emeritus and linguistics consultant Paul Frommer of the University of Southern California. He designed the language so as to be speakable by human actors, combining syntactic and grammatical rules from other existing languages. Frommer created over a thousand words for the Na'vi language and coached the actors who narrated Na'vi characters. When communicating to humans in the film, Na'vi characters – especially Neytiri – speak in accented and broken English.

Human visitors see the Na'vi as possessing a religion, whose chief and possibly sole deity is a benevolent goddess known as Eywa. The Na'vi are able to physically connect to Eywa when they use their braids to connect to the Tree of Souls and other similar flora which function as the global brain's interfaces. Eywa is said to have a connection to all things Pandoran.

Political power is exceedingly diffused, with each clan being a sovereign entity under either the diarchical rule of both a temporal chieftain (known as an Olo'eyktan) and a spiritual chieftain (known as a Tsahik), or the monarchical rule of a single individual who holds the two separate offices simultaneously. The numerous clans are seemingly only ever brought together as a tribe by Toruk Makto, a messianic war chief whose office is both non-permanent and apparently the only one with an authority that covers the entire race of Na'vi. By the time of the film, there had only been five Toruk Maktos in the history of the tribe, and the last one had ruled no fewer than four generations before the present day. This may be due to the fact that the Toruk Maktos seem to draw their power from a situation of explicitly external danger, and therefore are not really necessary for the day to day internal running of the tribal clans. Succession to the various offices is smooth, however, based more on popular recognition and customary worthiness than on anything else, and respect for hierarchical superiors appears to be high.

Fauna
James Cameron's core idea for the Avatars fictional creatures was for them to be "superslick and aerodynamic, and be like a race car with racing stripes". Neville Page worked on Avatar as the lead creature designer. He, Wayne Barlowe (author, artist, and initial lead creature designer), and Yuri Bartoli (concept designer and supervising virtual art director) adapted Cameron's conceptions of the fauna into a design that served three purposes: to appear expressive, to function with animation technology, and to seem realistic. He and creature designer Wayne Barlowe sought to base the design of Pandora's creatures on race cars, but they struggled to adapt the concept. Page drew on his education in automotive design, recognizing the irony that race cars were based on real-life animals in having "bone lines". Existing automotive designs drew from seashells, turtle shells, and insects, so the designers returned the design to the fictional creatures. They found that the prime challenge in designing most creatures was to give them organic appearances, including skin texture. Some creatures were also designed to have special breathing holes located in the trachea, copying how cars have intakes. Challenges that the creatures posed for visual effects technicians were to form "walk and run" cycles for six-legged creatures and to impart credible flying for creatures that had four wings.  Many of the animals also have four eyes, with an apparent major and minor eye on either side of their head.

The fictional creatures are not connected telepathically according to Cameron and the designers. However, even though they discussed the idea of the creatures being part of Pandora's "Worldmind", they preferred to interpret the creatures as having heightened instincts. Page explained, "Animals are hooked up to this planet. We're the ones who are detached.... The way I dealt with it was, We have so much rich [material] here to reference, that we don't have to dream up a whole new process of animal awareness."

The fictional moon has less gravity than Earth, so the creatures' larger sizes match their environment. Most Pandoran wildlife is hexapodal, or six-legged. Much of the fauna and flora is bioluminescent, which is seen in creatures on Earth such as fireflies, many deep sea animals, and some microscopic algae. The aforementioned breathing holes, located on multiple parts of a creature's body other than the mouth, are similar to spiracles in some of Earth's animals. The flying reptile-like creatures in the film can be compared to extinct flying reptiles such as pterosaurs and to the modern gliding lizard Draco sumatranus.

List of fauna

Direhorse 

The direhorse (Pa'li in Na'vi ) is a bioluminescent, hexapodal, superficially equine animal. It is scientifically known as Equidirus hoplites. The Na'vi use the direhorse to hunt. The direhorse was conceived and designed by Cameron and Stan Winston Studios. The Na'vi "break" a direhorse by connecting the fleshy tip of their hair to the animal's antennae. Xenobiologists call this a neural whip. Once intertwined, the Na'vi rider can communicate motor commands instantly through the neural interface; however, this connection does not lead to a lifelong, exclusive bond, as it does with the mountain banshee. Cameron described the creature as a "six-legged alien Clydesdale with moth-like antennae". The direhorse uses its long tongue to eat the sap out of pitcher plants.

Mountain banshee 
The mountain banshee (Ikran in Na'vi) is an airborne predator which lives in mountainous territory on Pandora. Na'vi warriors attempt to bond with a banshee, a dangerous and required rite of passage. They are cousins to the great leonopteryx and they are scientifically known by xenobiologists as Pterodactylus giganteus. A banshee bonds to a Na'vi warrior for life. They are four-winged creatures that, like the leonopteryx and direhorse, have a biologically produced carbon fiber flexing on the skin. Neytiri had a banshee named Seze (translated from the language of the Na'vi roughly as "blue flower"). Page spent the most time designing the banshee for the film so it would be convincing when it flew or perched. The designer said, "The hardest thing of all was having a Na'vi on top of it and flying it. You had to backwards engineer it. It was like designing and engineering an aircraft." Barlowe, who contributed to the banshee's design, was influenced by manta rays and skates as well as relatively little-known pterosaurs and plesiosaurs that had "many, unique aerodynamic and hydrodynamic" characteristics. Like the color scheme for the great leonopteryx, color schemes based on Earth animals were used for various banshees, though Page was inspired by Art Nouveau prints to warp the schemes so they would not look familiar to film audiences.

Great leonopteryx 

The great leonopteryx (Toruk in Na'vi, meaning last shadow) is the apex airborne predator native to Pandora. It is scientifically known as Leonopteryx rex, meaning "king lion-wing". The fierce beauty and nobility of the leonopteryx gave the species a place central to Na'vi lore and culture. The leonopteryx is scarlet with black stripes and a midnight blue crest on top of the head and on the lower jaw. It is celebrated in dance and song; elaborate totems symbolize both the fear and respect accorded to the creature. The leonopteryx is considered crucial to the Na'vi sense of destiny and interconnectedness. Prior to the events of the film, it had only been tamed five times, and Neytiri tells Jake that the riders (Toruk Makto) brought peace among the Pandoran tribes. This makes Jake the sixth Toruk Makto. He manages to capture one by jumping on it from above from his banshee but releases it after the battle with the humans has ended. The great leonopteryx and the banshee were designed with bright colors. Page based the colors on Earth's birds, poison dart frogs, and monarch butterflies, though he altered the patterns so that their inspirations would not be so conspicuous to moviegoers. The skull and crest shapes appear to be derived from pterosaurs from the genus Tapejara.

Hammerhead titanothere 

The hammerhead titanothere ('Angtsìk in Na'vi) is a large hexapodal herbivore whose massive, low-slung head features bony projections on either side of the skull, similar to those of hammerhead sharks and their bodies resemble the Brontotheres of Earth. These protrusions are often used to push and destroy objects: a single sideways thrust of the neck being sufficient to down a significantly sized tree. The titanothere has exceedingly thick, gray skin. There is a small "fan" feather structure on the head that it flares up as a warning symbol seen in the film and in the video game. The creature, which resembles a cross between a rhinoceros and a hammerhead shark, is easily aroused. Its hide is impervious to small arms fire, though firing on it is known to anger it. This massive, grazing creature travels in moderately large herds or packs of 10–20 animals. Avatar creature designer Yuri Bartoli explained about the creature's colorful threat display: "Originally, the hammerhead just had to be a huge creature, big enough that even a thanator would think twice about attacking one. A threat display is meant to be seen, so it required bright colors that would stand out against its more muted body". It is moderately social, but also extremely territorial and hierarchical. A soft ungulate mouth is protected by a rigid, beak-like jaw structure. The species is scientifically known as Titanotheris hammercephalis. In the climax of the film, a bunch of hammerhead titanothere assist the Na'vi in their battle against Colonel Miles Quaritch's army.

Hexapede 

The hexapede (Yerik in Na'vi) are hexapodal deer-like creatures. They are dark blue herbivores with white and yellow stripes. Twin horn structures sheathe a thin, patterned membrane structure. Their small, sloped skull is topped by this light-colored fan structure. This fan has an eye pattern on it similar to those found in actual insects. A skin membrane hangs under the jaw and runs the length of the neck. Twin lines of dark hairlike bristles run down the hexapede's back. The antennae are at the back at the head. As a threat display, the hexapede flares up its twin membrane structure like a satellite dish and retracts both lips. It is scientifically known as Sexcruscervus caeruleus.

Prolemuris 
 
The prolemuris (Syaksyuk in Na'vi) are blue, hexapodal creatures based on Earth's lemurs. They have two eyes, small nostrils, and their two upper arms on each side are partially fused. Like most Pandoran creatures, they have a queue on the back of their heads. They have lateral skin membranes on each side of the body. They have large eyes and grow 1.5 meters tall.

Thanator 
 
The thanator (Palulukan in Na'vi) is a large hexapodal land predator that is believed, by the RDA, to be the apex land predator. It is scientifically known as Bestiapanthera ferox. Cameron personally designed the creature. The thanator is first seen when Jake wanders off into the jungle and touches multiple helicoradian leaves, at which they retract to reveal a family of hammerhead titanotheres behind. The thanator frightens the titanotheres and pursues Jake. Jake later escapes the thanator by jumping off a cliff into pool below. It later appears during the climax where it assists Neytiri and later battles Quaritch's AMP Suit Beyond Glory, but is killed by the AMP suit's knife. The thanator is black with white fleshy skin under each hand. Its appearance is similar to a panther; Cameron describes the thanator as "the panther from hell". The thanator has ten sensory quills connected to six pads at the rear of the skull that flare up before it attacks the prey. The director explained how the thanator is the most fearsome creature on Pandora, "The thanator could eat a T-Rex and have the Alien for dessert."

Viperwolf 
 
The viperwolf (Nantang in Na'vi) is a hexapodal nocturnal carnivore. The species is scientifically known as Caniferratus costatus. It has bioluminescence for pack identification. Cameron described the viperwolves: "[They are] hairless with shiny skin that looks like overlapped armor. Most disturbing are its paws, which are like leathery hands." They are vicious in combat but treat their babies in a loving, nurturing way. Their first appearance is when Jake is lost at night and he is attacked by an angry pack of viper wolves, after which he is rescued by Neytiri. They are seen in the daytime caring for their babies and have green eyes. They have a laugh which sounds like Earth's hyenas. Like most Pandoran creatures, they have antennae. They have opposable thumbs allowing them to climb trees as well as stalk from the ground, thereby are able to create a three-dimensional hunting field.

Woodsprite 
 
The woodsprite (Atokirina in Na'vi) is an animal, also called seed, of the "holy tree", appearing similar to airborne jellyfish. Neytiri describes them as very pure spirits, and slaps Jake for shooing two of them away. The Omaticaya Clan plants one of these seeds on the body of a deceased Na'vi, so the Na'vi's consciousness will become part of Eywa.

Austrapede 

The austrapede is a Pandoran creature that resembles a cross between an ostrich, a pink flamingo and the herbivorous dinosaur Parasaurolophus. The Austrapede has yellow-orange skin with faint purple striping, a long, flat beak, and a flat tail reaching down to its feet. Unlike other Pandoran birds and its relative, the great austrapede, the austrapede's wings have shrunken down to small, vestigial appendages, and much of its height is made up by its legs and neck. Austrapedes flap their wings when frightened. The austrapedes are impulsive, fidgety creatures whose emotions spread quickly from one individual to the other by a form of mimicry. Relatively small by Pandoran standards, Austrapedes generally pose little threat to other creatures, and are sometimes affectionate to Na'vi. They first appear in the musical, Toruk – The First Flight.

Great austrapede 

The great austrapede is a bipedal, flightless, bird-like creature resembling the emu, ostrich, or the extinct Phorusrhacids that live in Pandoran savannah, and can be tamed and ridden as a mount by certain Na'vi clans. It has dark grey skin with blue-grey striping on its body and yellow markings on its wings, which it uses for threat displays and the long-clawed fingers at the ends for hunting and battling rivals. Great austrapedes stand slightly taller than their genetic cousin, the austrapede, and is a far more imposing creature overall. They first appear in the musical Toruk – The First Flight.

Turtapede 
 
The turtapede is a Pandoran creature that resembles a cross between a turtle, a platypus and a starfish. With its large dorsal fin and long tail, the turtapede is agile underwater. When emerging from the water, mesmerizing colors start to shimmer in the translucent area on its shell. They first appear in the musical Toruk – The First Flight.

Ilu 

The Ilu is a large plesiosaur-like sea creature that is ridden by the Metkayina Clan in place of the Direhorse. Sleek and lithe aquatic reptilian specimen with a long neck, six flippers and rudder-like tail, closely resembling Earth's extinct plesiosaur species. Four eyes and two kuru/queue antennae-like neural whips extending from its temples. They are introduced in Avatar: The Way of Water and are primary domesticated by the Reef People.

Skimwing 

The Skimwing ("Tsurak" in Na'vi) is a large Flying Fish like creature. They are primarily ridden by the Metkayina Clan in place of Banshee into battle. They do not form long-term bonds like the Mountain Banshee. They are first introduced in Avatar: The Way of Water, where Jake Sully tames one for battle.

Tulkun 

The Tulkun is a whale like creature native to Pandora's ocean. They are similar to Earth's whales and possess a form of sentience with their own language and culture which makes them capable of bonding with Na'vi in a more spiritual way. Each member of the Metkayina Clan forms a life-long bond with a tulkun as a spirit brother/sister. They are pacifistic and banish those who commit violence. They are introduced in Avatar: The Way of Water, in which humans have begun hunting them to harvest their brain enzymes for creating anti-aging remedies called amrita. Jake Sully's son, Lo'ak, bonds with an outcast tulkun named Payakan after he is banished for killing the whalers who killed his mother.

Akula 
The Akula is a shark like creature. They have 3 sets of jaws and is the apex predator of the Pandoran ocean. They are introduced in Avatar: The Way of Water, where Jake's son Lo'ak fights of one after he is stranded in the ocean, before being saved by a Tulkun.

Gill Mantle 
The Gill Mantle ("Txampaysye" in Na'vi) is a large jellyfish like creature native to Pandora's reefs. The Na'vi can bond with them in the water, which can supply them with oxygen through the water allowing Na'vi to remain underwater much longer. They are primarily used by Kiri throughout Avatar: The Way of Water.

Flora

Flora on Pandora are of a tropical type several times taller than that existing on Earth. Many, if not all, plant and animal species have bioluminescent properties. The flora specimens seen in the film were all designed by Jodie Holt, a professor of botany at the University of California, Riverside. According to Holt, Pandoran flora are able to communicate with each other through signal transduction and are larger in size than Earth flora due to greater atmospheric thickness, weaker gravity, and stronger magnetism on Pandora.

List of flora

Helicoradian 
 
The helicoradian (Loreyu in Na'vi) is a carnivorous plant that has red spiral-leaves. They are zooplantae, part animal, part plant. They are first seen when Jake wanders off into a forest of helicoradia and touches multiple leaves, at which they retract and coil up to reveal a hammerhead titanothere behind. According to Avatar designer Craig Shoji, the behavior and design of the helicoradian was based on the Christmas tree worms, tube worms that reside on coral reefs. In the video games, the species has the ability to heal the player.

Obesus rotundus 
 
The obesus rotundus (Rumut in Na'vi) is a tree that resembles a puffball tree.

Pseudocycas altissima 
 
The pseudocycas altissima (Tsyorina'wll in Na'vi) is a plant akin to a tall Earth cycad.

Hometrees 
 
The Hometrees (Kelutral in Na'vi) are great enough to house hundreds of clan members. The trees are honeycombed with natural hollows and alcoves in which the Na'vi sleep, eat, weave, dance, and celebrate their connection to Eywa. A distinguishable feature of the movie landscape, the tree itself is central to the movie story arc. Like many sacred sites on Pandora, the Giant Hometree sits above a large deposit of unobtanium. It is destroyed by the humans using rockets and missiles, which leads to the Na'vi clans' alliance against the humans.

The Tree of Souls (Ayvitrayä Ramunong in Na'vi [Cameron: Vitraya Ramunong])  is a tree where the Na'vi are able to communicate with the biological network that exists throughout Pandora. Cameron described the Tree of Souls as "a big input-output station", having been inspired by the bioluminescence that he encountered during night diving. In the film, the tree is seen to be capable of transferring a specific consciousness from one body to another.

The Tree of Voices (Utral Aymokriyä in Na'vi [Cameron: Utraya Mokri])  are the most important trees to the Na'vi after the Tree of Souls. They are smaller than the Tree of Souls, but their appearance is quite similar and they too are illuminated. Neytiri reveals to Jake the tree allows the Na'vi to hear the voices of their ancestors. They are destroyed in the bulldozer attack by the humans. This was where Jake and Neytiri chose each other as mates and mated before Eywa.
 
They are other unnamed plants and trees on Pandora that resemble those on Earth; ferns, palm trees, mosses, grasses, bamboo, and succulents. Several forest plants of Pandora also resemble the Earth's zoanthid soft corals, which can be bioluminescent, as in the movie.

References
 Text was copied from Austrapede at Avatar Wiki, which is released under a Creative Commons Attribution-Share Alike 3.0 (Unported) (CC-BY-SA 3.0) license.

 Text was copied from Great Austrapede at Avatar Wiki, which is released under a Creative Commons Attribution-Share Alike 3.0 (Unported) (CC-BY-SA 3.0) license.

 Text was copied from Turtapede at Avatar Wiki, which is released under a Creative Commons Attribution-Share Alike 3.0 (Unported) (CC-BY-SA 3.0) license.

External links

 Pandorapedia.com
 "The Tet Zoo guide to the creatures of Avatar" at Tetrapod Zoology
 "The Complete History Of Pandora, According To Avatar's Designers" at Gizmodo
 Is the 'Avatar' Concept Really Possible? by CNN

Avatar (franchise)
Fantasy worlds
Fictional moons
Fictional elements introduced in 2009